Atilio Boveri was born in Rauch, Buenos Aires on 6 April 1885. He was a leading figure in the visual arts of Argentina, who worked as a painter, engraver, ceramist, and architect, as well as a historian, journalist, and writer.

Boveri died in his home in Manuel B. Gonnet on 17 February 1949.

References 

1885 births
1949 deaths
People from Buenos Aires
Argentine painters
Argentine male painters